Richard Douglas Harries, Baron Harries of Pentregarth,  (born 2 June 1936) is a retired bishop of the Church of England and former British Army officer. He was the Bishop of Oxford from 1987 to 2006. From 2008 until 2012 he was the Gresham Professor of Divinity.

Education and army career
Harries was educated at Wellington College and Royal Military Academy Sandhurst. He was commissioned as a second lieutenant in the Royal Corps of Signals on 16 December 1955 and was promoted to lieutenant two years later. He left the active Regular Army on 12 September 1958 (transferring to the reserve of officers), and went to Selwyn College, Cambridge, where he studied theology (BA 1961, MA 1965), before going on to Cuddesdon College (1961–63) to study for ordination. He formally resigned his original army commission on 18 March 1965, but was immediately recommissioned as Chaplain to the Forces 4th Class in the Territorial Army; on 29 October 1969 he once more transferred to the reserve.

Church ministry
Harries was made deacon in 1963, becoming assistant curate of Hampstead St John in the Diocese of London (1963–69). He was ordained priest the following year and later combined his ministry at St John's with the chaplaincy of the former Westfield College (now part of Queen Mary, University of London) (1967–69). He became a tutor at Wells Theological College (1969–71) and was then warden of the new Salisbury and Wells Theological College (1971–72).

He returned to parish ministry as vicar of All Saints', Fulham (1972–1981) and returned to academia as Dean of King's College London (1981–1987). He was appointed Bishop of Oxford in 1987, being consecrated on 28 May at St Paul's Cathedral by Robert Runcie, Archbishop of Canterbury and taking a seat as a Lord Spiritual in the House of Lords in 1993. In 1999 he was appointed to the Royal Commission (chaired by John Wakeham) to investigate a possible reorganisation of the House of Lords, which produced the Wakeham Report. He retired on 2 June 2006, his 70th birthday.

In the week prior to his retirement, on 26 May 2006, Downing Street announced that he was to be made a life peer, and he was gazetted as Baron Harries of Pentregarth, of Ceinewydd in the County of Dyfed on 30 June 2006. He sits as a cross-bencher. On 4 August 2006, he was appointed to the Court of Ecclesiastical Causes Reserved for a period of five years.

Other activities
In 1986, Harries took up a subsidiary appointment as consultant to the archbishops of Canterbury and York on inter-faith relations. As Bishop of Oxford he became a founder member of the Oxford Abrahamic Group, bringing together Christian, Muslim, and Jewish scholars. He chaired the Council of Christians and Jews from 1992 until 2001. In 1988 he was president of the Johnson Society, delivering a presidential address on "Johnson – A Church of England Saint". He has been a member of the Human Fertilisation and Embryology Authority (including serving as chair of the HFEA Ethics and Law Committee) and a member of the Nuffield Council on Bioethics, as well as chairing the House of Lords select committee on stem cell research. He was chairman of the Church of England Board for Social Responsibility (1996–2001) and chairman of the House of Bishops' Working Party on Issues in Human Sexuality and has served on the board of Christian Aid. He was also a member of the Royal Commission on the Reform of the House of Lords (the Wakeham Commission). A regular contributor to the Today programme on BBC Radio 4, including many appearances on Thought for the Day, he has published three books of radio talks. He is a patron of POWER International, a charity working with disabled people in poor countries.

Harries was a member of the Nuffield Council on Bioethics 2002–2008. In 2002 he was visiting professor at Liverpool Hope University College. In 2008 he replaced Keith Ward as the Gresham Professor of Divinity.

Harries insisted that there was no conflict between science and religion. He was critical of both outspoken atheists and creationists: "From time to time, I see American creationist magazines with articles by people claiming to have doctorates in science. Judging religion only on the basis of its least credible examples is as though I judged all science on the basis of creationist science."

Harries currently serves as an Advisory Steering Group member for the Commission on Religion and Belief in British Public Life.

Harries is the author of 26 books on the interface of Christian faith and wider culture, including ethics, politics and the arts, especially the visual arts. These include  The Passion in Art (Ashgate 2004) and Art and the Beauty of God (Continuum 2000), which was chosen as a book of the year by the Anthony Burgess in The Observer when it was originally published in 1993. The Re-Enchantment of Morality (SPCK 2008) was shortlisted for the 2011 Michael Ramsey prize for theological writing. The Image of Christ in Modern Art was published by Ashgate in October 2013.

Harries reviews books regularly for the Church Times.

Legacy and reputation

His passion for social justice influenced his liberal views. At the start of his episcopacy, he brought legal proceedings challenging the Church Commissioners' policy on investment. He and his co-plaintiffs argued that the Church Commissioners placed too much emphasis on purely financial considerations and insufficient emphasis upon the promotion of the Christian faith. Although this challenge failed – the Commissioners already had an ethical investment policy, albeit one which excluded a smaller part of the UK share market than the plaintiffs had wanted to exclude – the Court recognised that it was proper for charities to consider whether their investment strategies would alienate the charity's financial supporters.

In 1996, Harries formed part of a working group of church leaders looking to address the rise of rough sleepers in west London. Harries and the other original founders championed the need for an open-access shelter that welcomed all in need, regardless of local connection, religion or nationality. The group, formerly known as West London Churches Homeless Concern, gained charity status in 2000 and changed its name to "Glass Door" in 2014. It continues to operate church-based homeless shelters across central and south-west London.

In 2014, Harries stated in the House of Lords that the next British coronation in Westminster Abbey should feature readings from the Quran, the holy book of Islam.

On 11 February 2017, Harries was one of fourteen retired bishops to sign an open letter to the then-serving bishops of the Church of England. In an unprecedented move, they expressed their opposition to the House of Bishops' report to General Synod on sexuality, which recommended no change to the church's canons or practices around sexuality. By 13 February, a serving bishop (Alan Wilson, Bishop of Buckingham) and nine further retired bishops had added their signatures; on 15 February, the report was rejected by synod.

Honours
Harries was appointed a fellow of King's College London (FKC) in 1983, a fellow of the Royal Society of Literature in 1996, and an honorary fellow of the Academy of Medical Sciences in 2004. In 1994 he became a Doctor of Divinity honoris causa of the University of London and in 2001 he was honoured with the degree of Doctor of the University (DUniv) by Oxford Brookes University.

In 2012, he was awarded the President's Medal by the British Academy.

Bibliography
Prayers of Hope (BBC, 1975) 
Turning to Prayer (Mowbray, 1978), 
Prayers of Grief and Glory (Lutterworth Press, 1979), 
Being a Christian (Mowbray, 1981),  (published in the U.S. as What Christians Believe)
Should a Christian Support Guerrillas? (Lutterworth Press, 1982), 
What Hope in an Armed World? (Pickering & Inglis, 1982),  (ed.)
The Authority of Divine Love (Blackwell, 1983), 
Praying Round the Clock (Mowbray, 1983), 
Seasons of the Spirit: Readings Through the Christian Year (ed. with George Every and Kallistos Ware) (SPCK, 1984),  (published in the U.S. as The Time of the Spirit)
Morning Has Broken: Thoughts and Prayers from BBC Radio 4's "Today" Programme (Marshalls, 1985), 
Prayer and the Pursuit of Happiness (Fount, 1985), 
Reinhold Niebuhr and the Issues of Our Time (Mowbray, 1986),  (ed.)
Christianity & War in a Nuclear Age (Mowbray, 1986), 
The One Genius: Readings Through the Year with Austin Farrer (SPCK, 1987), 
Christ Is Risen (Mowbray, 1987), 
Evidence for the Love of God (Mowbray, 1987), 
C. S. Lewis: The Man and His God (Fount, 1987), 
Shalom and Pax: Christian Concepts of Peace (Oxford Project for Peace Studies, 1990), 
Is There a Gospel for the Rich?: Christian Obedience in a Capitalist World (Mowbray, 1992), 
Art and the Beauty of God: A Christian Understanding (Mowbray, 1993), 
The Real God: A Response to Anthony Freeman's "God in Us" (Mowbray, 1994), 
A Gallery of Reflections: The Nativity of Christ (Lion, 1995), 
Questioning Belief (SPCK, 1995), 
Two Cheers for Secularism (Pilkington Press, 1998),  (ed. with Sidney Brichto)
In the Gladness of Today: Thoughts for the Day (Fount, 1999), 
Christianity: Two Thousand Years (Oxford University Press, 2001),  (ed. with Henry Mayr-Harting)
God Outside the Box: Why Spiritual People Object to Christianity (SPCK, 2002), 
After the Evil: Christianity and Judaism in the Shadow of the Holocaust (Oxford University Press, 2003), 
The Passion in Art (Ashgate, 2004), 
Abraham's Children: Jews, Christians and Muslims in Conversation (T&T Clark, 2005),  (ed. with Norman Solomon and Tim Winter and Dale Harries)
 The Re-enchantment of Morality (2008)
 Faith in Politics? Rediscovering the Christian Roots of our Political Values (2010)
 Issues of Life and Death: Christian Faith and Medical Intervention (2010)
 Reinhold Niebuhr and Contemporary Politics. God and Power (editor, 2010)
 The Image of Christ in Modern Art (Ashgate 2013),

See also
Harries v The Church Commissioners for England

References

Further reading

 Forthcoming.

External links
Biography page on Gresham College website
Official announcement of his peerage
Announcement of his introduction at the House of Lords
Commission on Religion and Belief in British Public Life

Bishops of Oxford
Alumni of Ripon College Cuddesdon
Royal Corps of Signals officers
Royal Army Chaplains' Department officers
Graduates of the Royal Military Academy Sandhurst
1936 births
Living people
People educated at Wellington College, Berkshire
Crossbench life peers 
Ordained peers
Alumni of Selwyn College, Cambridge
Academics of Liverpool Hope University
Deans of King's College London
Fellows of King's College London
Honorary Fellows of Selwyn College, Cambridge
People associated with Westfield College
Fellows of the Royal Society of Literature
Fellows of the Academy of Medical Sciences (United Kingdom)
Professors of Gresham College
Recipients of the President's Medal (British Academy)
20th-century British Army personnel
Life peers created by Elizabeth II